Mrkša Žarković was a Serbian nobleman who ruled the parts of today's southern Albania from 1396 to 1414.

Life
His father was Žarko, a leading nobleman in Zeta after Emperor Stefan Dušan's death, mentioned in June 1357 as Emperor Uroš's nobleman. Mrkša's mother was Teodora Dejanović, the daughter of Dejan, one of Stefan Dušan's magnates.

In 1391, Mrkša married Ruđina Balšić, the daughter of Balša II, a lord in Zeta, and Komnina Asen, daughter of Jovan Asen. As a dowry Balša II received Valona, Berat, Kanina, and Himarë in the south of Albania. After Balša II's death in the Battle of Savra, his wife Komnina ruled over his territory until 1396, when she became a nun and gave her territories to son-in-law Mrkša. Mrkša became a Lord of Berat, Valona and Kanina.

Mrkša was able to hold his territories until his death in October 1414. After his death his wife Ruđina tried to transfer Mrkša's possessions to the Republic of Venice in 1415 and 1416, but an agreement was never reached. So in 1417, the whole area was conquered by the Ottoman Empire.

References

Sources 
 

14th-century Serbian nobility
15th-century Serbian nobility
Lords of Zeta
People of the Serbian Empire
Medieval Serbian military leaders
Serbs of Montenegro
Serbs in Albania
1363 births
1414 deaths